Marvin Degon (born July 20, 1983, in Worcester, Massachusetts) is an American professional ice hockey defenseman, currently playing for HDD Olimpija Ljubljana of the Austrian Hockey League (EBEL).

Playing career
Degon attended the University of Massachusetts Amherst where he played four years of college hockey with the UMass Minutemen men's ice hockey team from 2002-06.

Undrafted following college, Degon stepped right in the American Hockey League to play with the Hartford Wolf Pack the final games of the 2005–06 AHL season and playoffs.

On July 5, 2007 Degon was signed as a free agent by the  Montreal Canadiens who assigned him to their AHL affiliate, the Hamilton Bulldogs, for the 2007–08 AHL season.

On August 18, 2014, Degon returned to the EBEL, signing with Slovenian club HDD Olimpija Ljubljana; he began with a one-year deal.

Career statistics

Awards and honors

References

External links

1983 births
Living people
American men's ice hockey defensemen
Grizzlys Wolfsburg players
Eisbären Berlin players
Elmira Jackals (ECHL) players
ERC Ingolstadt players
Hamilton Bulldogs (AHL) players
Hartford Wolf Pack players
HDD Olimpija Ljubljana players
Ice hockey people from Worcester, Massachusetts
Providence Bruins players
Reading Royals players
Trenton Titans players
UMass Minutemen ice hockey players
EC VSV players